Braddock: Missing in Action III  is a 1988 American action adventure film, and a sequel to Missing in Action, following the second film, Missing in Action 2: The Beginning, which was a prequel. It is the third and final installment in the Missing in Action film series. The film stars Chuck Norris, who co-wrote the screenplay with James Bruner. The film was directed by Norris' brother, Aaron Norris.

Plot
Colonel James Braddock (Chuck Norris), Vietnam War veteran, had believed his Asian wife Lin Tan Cang (Miki Kim) to be dead since the war ended in 1975, but he hears from a missionary, Reverend Polanski (Yehuda Efroni), that Lin is not only alive, but that she and Braddock have a 12-year-old son named Van Tan Cang (Roland Harrah III).

At first, Braddock does not believe it, but when cold-blooded CIA boss Littlejohn (Jack Rader) tells Braddock to disregard that information, that is when Braddock knows it is true. Braddock heads back into Vietnam through parachute deployment and with the help of an Australian C-47 pilot. After parachute descent, Braddock outruns Vietnamese Navy patrol boats with a jet-powered speedboat.

Reverend Polanski leads Braddock to Lin and Van. Attempting to flee the country, Braddock, Lin, and Van are captured by the soldiers of the sadistic Vietnamese General Quoc (Aki Aleong). Quoc kills Lin on the spot, and has his soldiers take Braddock and Van to a compound to be tortured.

Later, Braddock overpowers his guards, frees Van, and heads for the mission that is run by Polanski. Quoc anticipates the move and takes all the mission children into captivity, along with Van and Polanski, and Braddock sets out to free them all from Quoc by going to his weapons cache that he had hidden a few days prior. He equips himself with a modified Heckler & Koch G3 battle rifle with an underslung 6-shot rotary grenade launcher and attachments including a spring-loaded bayonet. He raids the camp killing the guards and loading up one of the trucks with all the children including his son, Van and the Reverend. Soon after escaping they are followed and attacked by a Vietnamese-captured US UH-1 Huey.

After they escape Braddock takes the children on foot and find a Vietnamese airstrip. Braddock silently takes out the guards and hijacks a C-47 Dakota plane. The plane is then attacked by Vietnamese guards causing fuel to leak out of the plane, eventually crashing just outside the Cambodian-Thailand border. Braddock then raids the border station where Thai and US troops are watching on the other side, cheering Braddock on. When Braddock kills all the opposing troops, more pour in. Braddock is injured by a grenade. When General Quoc then flies in on a Vietnamese Mil-24 Hind gunship thinking he has Braddock all to himself, two US helicopters on the side of the Thai border confront Quoc's gunship. Taunting each other to cross, Braddock and his son Van fire at Quoc's ship, hitting the pilot. The gunship crashes, killing Quoc. The US troops pour over the border and bridge and help the wounded Braddock and the children.

Cast

 Chuck Norris as Colonel James Braddock
 Aki Aleong as General Quoc
 Roland Harrah III  as Van Tan Cang
 Yehuda Efroni as Reverend Polanski
 Floyd Levine as General Duncan 
 Miki Kim as Lin Tan Cang
 Ron Barker as "Mik" Mikalchek
 Jack Rader as CIA Agent Littlejohn
 Keith David as Embassy Gate Captain

Production

Development
Norris had a long-term deal with Cannon Films. They were in financial trouble and wanted a new Missing in Action film. Norris says that he was not interested in doing a third film until his brother Aaron told him about the Amerasian children: "In Vietnam there are 15,000 Amerasian children who are trapped there, considered outcasts, living a strictly non-existent life. So I started reading up on the subject and got emotionally involved".

Norris was particularly affected by a segment he saw on the ABC TV show 20/20: "An American soldier fell in love over there in Vietnam, but the Army wouldn't let him marry her. He went back and tried to get her over because he knew she was pregnant. Finally, she had the baby over there and died. So the next 14 years he spent trying to locate (the child) and get him out of the country. But finally he did it, and there were tears and everything then. It really hit you". Norris wrote the script with James Bruner.

Filming
Filming was to start 1 December 1986 with Joseph Zito who directed the original film to direct, but due to creative and personal differences with Chuck Norris, Zito left the production. In March, Jack Smight was attached to direct. Eventually Aaron Norris wound up making his directorial debut on the film. Norris later said that Aaron saved Braddock after going through several other directors. Aaron Norris would go on to direct six more films with his brother, as well as helping him run Walker, Texas Ranger.

On May 30, 1987, four military and police officers were killed in an AUH-76 helicopter of the Philippine Air Force accident during filming in the Philippines. There would also be a fatal helicopter crash in a later Norris film, Delta Force 2: The Colombian Connection.

Norris thought that it was the best film he ever made prior to its release.

Reception

Box office
Norris said that Missing in Action and Missing in Action 2: The Beginning put Cannon on the New York Stock Exchange, as Cannon Films was in the state of bankruptcy.

The movie debuted at No. 5 at the box office with $2,210,401 in the opening weekend. It was the least financially successful film in the Missing in Action film series.

Norris said he was "frustrated", with the job Cannon Films did with marketing the film: "I was ready to break my contract because it was the best of the series. We had a big meeting, and I told them that if they didn't do a better job marketing my films in the U.S., I was going to take them to court because my career is on the line".

Critical response
Walter Goodman of The New York Times wrote: "Wearing a worried expression beneath a week's worth of beard, Braddock knocks off what remains of the Vietnamese Army, already pretty well decimated by their earlier encounters ... As that general remarks before he meets the fate of all of Braddock's adversaries, 'This has gone on long enough'". Variety said: "Chuck Norris manages to pull off a strangely timely and involving story about getting a bunch of Amerasian kids out of Vietnam within the confines of his usual 1-man army action meller parameters. Not to say this is emotional stuff, just up a notch from past chapters that have managed to attract mostly a redneck following at the b.o." Dave Kehr of the Chicago Tribune gave the film 2 stars out of 4 and wrote: "It's a passable action film, though like most of Norris' vehicles, it's an almost completely colorless one". Leonard Klady of the Los Angeles Times called the film "a by-the-numbers filmed atrocity. One can just imagine a game caller saying: 'Under the 'I', 17 Amerasian children tortured; under the 'N', 49 Vietnamese soldiers blown to kingdom come'. It all adds up to the movie game of J-I-N-G-O, which ought to be a felony". Hal Hinson of The Washington Post wrote: "We could say this is mind-bogglingly insulting, lowest-common-denominator-style filmmaking, that it's gratuitously racist and violent and just plain dumb, but then wouldn't that be stating the obvious? But what response would be fitting and adequate and not be obvious? Keening? Shrieking? A full-fledged, spread-eagle tantrum?"

See also
 List of American films of 1988
 Chuck Norris filmography

References

External links
 
 
 

1988 films
1980s action war films
1980s action adventure films
1980s English-language films
Films about the Central Intelligence Agency
Films set in 1975
Films set in 1987
Films directed by Aaron Norris
Films set in Thailand
Golan-Globus films
Vietnam War films
War adventure films
American sequel films
American action adventure films
American action war films
Films shot in the Philippines
Films scored by Jay Chattaway
1988 directorial debut films
Films produced by Menahem Golan
Films produced by Yoram Globus
1980s American films